Gerardo Joseph Colacicco  (born September 19, 1955) is an American prelate of the Roman Catholic Church who has been serving as auxiliary bishop for the Archdiocese of New York since 2019. He serves as the episcopal vicar for the northern counties of the Archdiocese.

Biography

Early life 
Geraldo Colacicco was born on September 19, 1955, in Poughkeepsie, New York, the eldest of four children of Angelo and Irma Colacicco. He grew up in a tight knit extended family that attended Our Lady of Mount Carmel Church and St. Mary's. His father, having retired from the US Postal Service, became a custodian at St. Mary's, where Colacicco himself, during high school and college, worked at the rectory. He identifies St. Mary's pastor, Matthew J. Cox, and Mount Carmel's Joseph Maria Pernicone as having had a great influence on him. 

Colacicco graduated with a bachelor’s degree in history from Marist College in Poughkeepsie, New York with minors in philosophy and Russian studies. He then entered Saint Joseph's Seminary in Yonkers, New York. During his studies Colacicco served as a deacon at Sacred Heart Parish in Newburgh, New York.

Priesthood 
On November 6, 1982, Colacicco was ordained to the priesthood for the Archdiocese of New York by Cardinal Terence Cooke.

Colacicco served as parochial vicar at Good Shepherd Parish in Rhinebeck, New York, Our Lady of Fatima in Scarsdale, New York, and at St. Denis Parish in Hopewell Junction, New York. In 1989, he was appointed secretary to Cardinal John O'Connor. In 1992, Colacicco received a Licentiate of Canon Law from the Pontifical University of Saint Thomas Aquinas in Rome. He then became director of pastoral formation at St. Joseph’s Seminary.

Colacicco returned to Sacred Heart as pastor in 1996. He was named by the Vatican as a monsignor in 1999, and in 2002 became pastor of St. Columba's Parish in Hopewell Junction. In 2014, he was transferred to St. Joseph Parish  in Millbrook, New York. Colacicco is a member of the Knights of Columbus and is an associate chaplain for the New York State Council.

Auxiliary Bishop of New York 
Pope Francis appointed Colacicco as an auxiliary bishop for the Archdiocese of New York on October 10, 2019.  On December 10, 2019, Colacicco was consecrated as a bishop by Cardinal Timothy Dolan. He serves as the episcopal vicar for the northern counties of the archdiocese which include Dutchess, Orange, Putnam, Ulster, and Sullivan counties.

In April 2020, as part of the Good Friday liturgy at St. Patrick's Cathedral in Manhattan, Colacicco gave a mediation on the Seven Last Words spoken by Jesus from the cross. Due to the coronavirus pandemic, the service was livestreamed. His reflections were subsequently published in Beneath the Cross.

See also

 Catholic Church hierarchy
 Catholic Church in the United States
 Historical list of the Catholic bishops of the United States
 List of Catholic bishops of the United States

References

External links
Archdiocese of New York Official Site

 

1955 births
Living people
People from Poughkeepsie, New York
21st-century Roman Catholic bishops in the United States
People of the Roman Catholic Archdiocese of New York
Bishops appointed by Pope Francis